Via Terra Group (formerly Via Terra Spedition) is a private railway company in Romania. It began activity in 2001 with freight transport and expanded into passenger services in 2009.

Passenger transport
Passenger trains are run by Via Terra's branch Regional. Rolling stock is made up mostly of used SNCF Class X4500 Diesel multiple units.
They operate several routes:
Bistrița – Bistrița Bârgăului
Bistrița – Cluj-Napoca
Oradea – Salonta – Vașcău
Oradea – Marghita – Sărmășag
Oradea – Cheresig

References

External links

Railway companies of Romania
Passenger rail transport in Romania